List of the published work of Gideon Haigh, Australian journalist.

Books

Cricket related 

 (1993) The Cricket War: The Inside Story of Kerry Packer's World Series Cricket
 (1994) The Border Years
 (1995) One Summer Every Summer: An Ashes Journal
 (1996) On Top Down Under: The Story of Australia's Cricket Captains
 (1997) The Summer Game: Australian Test Cricket 1949–71
 (1997) Australian Cricket Anecdotes (ed.)
 (1999) Mystery Spinner: The Story of Jack Iverson (with Russell Jackson)
 (1999) Wisden Cricketers' Almanack Australia 1999–2000
 (2000) Wisden Cricketers' Almanack Australia 2000–01
 (2001) The Big Ship: Warwick Armstrong and the Making of Modern Cricket
 (2002) Many a Slip: A Diary of a Club Cricket Season
 (2002) The Vincibles: A Suburban Cricket Odyssey
 (2002) Endless Summer: 140 Years of Australian Cricket in Wisden
 (2004) Game for Anything: Writings on Cricket
 (2005) Ashes 2005: The Full Story of the Test Series
 (2006) Peter the Lord's Cat: And Other Unexpected Obituaries from Wisden (ed.)
 (2006) The Book of Ashes Anecdotes (ed.)
 (2007) All Out: The Ashes 2006–2007
 (2007) Silent Revolutions: Writings on Cricket History, 
 (2007) Inside Story: Unlocking Australian Cricket's Archives (with David Frith)
 (2008) Inside Out: Writings on Cricket Culture  
 (2009) The Greatest Test: The Story of the 2009 Ashes Series
 (2011) Out of the Running: The 2010-2011 Ashes Series
 (2012) On Warne
 (2013) Uncertain Corridors: Writings on Modern Cricket
 (2014) Ashes to Ashes: How Australia Came Back and England Came Unstuck, 2013-14
 (2016) Stroke of Genius: Victor Trumper and the Shot That Changed Cricket
 (2017) An Eye on Cricket
 (2018) Crossing the Line
 (2018) Shadows on the Pitch: The Long Summer of 2017-2018
 (2019) The Standard Bearers: Australia v India, Pakistan and Sri Lanka 2018-19
 (2022) The All-rounder - The inside story of big time cricket with Dan Christian,

Other 

 (1987) The Battle for BHP
 (1999) One of a Kind: The Story of Bankers Trust Australia 1969–1999
 (2003) The Uncyclopedia,  
 (2004) Fat Cats: The Strange Cult of the CEO
 (2004) Tencyclopedia, 
 (2006) Asbestos House
 (2008) The Racket: How Abortion Became Legal in Australia
 (2012) The Office: A Hardworking History
 (2012) The Deserted Newsroom
 (2013) End of the Road?
 (2015) Certain Admissions: A Beach, a Body and a Lifetime of Secrets
 (2018) A Scandal in Bohemia: The Life and Death of Mollie Dean, at Penguin Books Australia, 
 (2019) This is How I Will Strangle You
 (2020) The Momentous, Uneventful Day: A Requiem for the Office
 (2021) The Brilliant Boy: Doc Evatt and the Great Australian Dissent
 (2021) Shelf Life: Journalism 2000–2021
 (2022) The Night Was a Bright Moonlight and I Could See a Man Quite Plain - An Edwardian cricket murder

Essays and book reviews 
 
 Review of Michael Wolff, The man who owns the news.

 Review of Lindsay Tanner, Sideshow : dumbing down democracy.

Bibliographies by writer
Bibliographies of Australian writers